Habershon  may refer to:

Ada R. Habershon, English Christian hymnist
Matthew Habershon (1789–1852), English architect
Samuel Osborne Habershon, English physician
Edward Habershon, English architect, son of Matthew Habershon
William Habershon, English architect, son of Matthew Habershon and partner in Habershon and Fawckner